Orzewo  is a settlement in the administrative district of Gmina Świdnica, within Zielona Góra County, Lubusz Voivodeship, in western Poland.

The settlement has a population of 150.

References

Orzewo